Abdullah Jassim (Arabic:عبد الله جاسم) (born 22 February 1997) is an Emirati footballer who plays as a defender for Al-Wasl.

Career
Abdullah Jassim started his career at Al-Wasl and is a product of the Al-Wasl's youth system. On 15 April 2017, Abdullah Jassim made his professional debut for Al-Wasl against Al-Ain in the Pro League, replacing Ahmed Al Shamisi.

External links

References

1997 births
Living people
Emirati footballers
Al-Wasl F.C. players
Ajman Club players
UAE Pro League players
Association football defenders
Place of birth missing (living people)